Rha Woong-bae (24 July 1934 – 25 April 2022) was a South Korean politician and businessman who was the Chairman of the Hanbit Forum. He was also Finance and Economy Minister and Deputy Prime Minister of South Korea under President Kim Dae-jung. He served as Trade and Industry Minister in the 1980s.

He held a PhD (1968) from the Haas School of Business at the University of California, Berkeley.

References

1934 births
2022 deaths
Haas School of Business alumni
Government ministers of South Korea
Deputy Prime Ministers of South Korea
Finance ministers of South Korea
Members of the National Assembly (South Korea)
20th-century South Korean businesspeople
Presidents of universities and colleges in South Korea
Academic staff of Seoul National University
Seoul National University alumni
Stanford University alumni
University of California, Berkeley alumni
Businesspeople from Seoul
Naju Na clan
20th-century South Korean politicians